Oggebbio is a comune (municipality) in the Province of Verbano-Cusio-Ossola in the Italian region Piedmont, located about  northeast of Turin and about  northeast of Verbania.

Oggebbio borders the following municipalities: Aurano, Brezzo di Bedero, Cannero Riviera, Castelveccana, Ghiffa, Porto Valtravaglia, Premeno, Trarego Viggiona.

References

Cities and towns in Piedmont